Kurt Frank Reinhardt (November 6, 1896 – June 13, 1983) was a German-born American Germanist, philosopher and educator who was Professor at the Department of Modern European Languages and of the German Studies Department at Stanford University from 1930 to 1962.

Biography
Kurt Frank Reinhardt was born in Munich on November 6, 1896. He attended the classical gymanisum in Mannheim, and subsequently studied literature, philosophy, and art history at the University of Munich, Heidelberg University and University of Freiburg. During World War I, he worked as a dramaturge. Since 1925 he worked for Verlag Herder, a major German publisher. During this time Reinhardt was a correspondent for the Frankfurter Allgemeine Zeitung.

From 1928 to 1930, Reinhardt taught German literature at the University of Oregon. From 1930 to 1962, he was Professor at the Department of Modern European Languages and of the German Studies Department at Stanford University. Reinhardt died in Palo Alto on June 13, 1983.

Works
 Germany: 2000 years, 1950
 The Existentialist Revolt, 1952

Sources

 

1896 births
1983 deaths
Germanists
Heidelberg University alumni
Ludwig Maximilian University of Munich alumni
Writers from Munich
Stanford University faculty
University of Freiburg alumni
University of Oregon faculty
German emigrants to the United States